Plenodomus destruens is a fungal plant pathogen infecting potatoes.

References

Fungal plant pathogens and diseases
Potato diseases
Pleosporales